Bossiaea rufa is a species of flowering plant in the family Fabaceae and is endemic to the south-west of Western Australia. It is a loose, many-branched shrub with elliptic to egg-shaped leaves with the narrower end towards the base, and deep yellow and red flowers.

Description
Bossiaea rufa is a loose, many-branched shrub that typically grows to a height of up to  when supported by surrounding vegetation. Muelleria 23 |journal=Muelleria |date=2006 |volume=11 |pages=108–110 |url=https://www.biodiversitylibrary.org/item/278250#page/110/mode/1up |access-date=28 August 2021}}</ref>

Taxonomy and namingBossiaea rufa was first formally described in 1812 by Robert Brown in Hortus Kewensis. The specific epithet (rufa) means "reddish-brown".

Distribution and habitat
This bossiaea usually grows in sandy soil in moist places near streams and swamps in the Esperance Plains, Jarrah Forest, Mallee, Swan Coastal Plain and Warren biogeographic regions of south-western Western Australia.

Conservation statusBossiaea rufa'' is classified as "not threatened" by the Government of Western Australia Department of Biodiversity, Conservation and Attractions.

References

rufa
Mirbelioids
Flora of Western Australia
Plants described in 1812
Taxa named by Robert Brown (botanist, born 1773)